The white-capped fruit dove (Ptilinopus dupetithouarsii) is a species of bird in the family Columbidae. It was described by French naturalist and surgeon Adolphe-Simon Neboux in 1840. It is endemic to the Marquesas Islands in French Polynesia. The name honours French admiral and botanist Abel Aubert du Petit-Thouars.

References

white-capped fruit dove
Birds of the Marquesas Islands
white-capped fruit dove
Taxonomy articles created by Polbot
Endemic birds of French Polynesia
Taxa named by Adolphe-Simon Neboux